The Wills Wing Eagle is an American high-wing, single-place, hang glider that was designed and produced by Wills Wing of Santa Ana, California. Now out of production, when it was available the aircraft was supplied complete and ready-to-fly.

Design and development
The Eagle was designed as an intermediate-level glider. It is made from aluminum tubing, with the mostly double-surface wing covered in Dacron sailcloth and cable braced from a single kingpost. Its nose angle is 122°.

The models are each named for their rough wing area in square feet. The Eagle was certified to HGMA and DHV standards.

Variants
Eagle 145
Small-sized model for lighter pilots.
Eagle 164
Mid-sized model for medium-weight pilots.
Eagle 180
Large-sized model for heavier pilots.

Specifications (Eagle 145)

References

External links
Official Eagle Owner's Manual
Photo of a Wills Wing Eagle

Eagle
Hang gliders